Martin Písařík (born 1 July 1979 in Prague) is a Czech film, television, stage and voice actor. He studied at the Jaroslav Ježek Conservatory. He performed the character of Oskar Všetečka in the Czech soap opera Ordinace v růžové zahradě.

Theatre

ABC Theatre
Frederick .... Parisot
The Importance of Being Earnest .... Algernon Moncrief
Příliš počestná žena .... Jakub
Spor .... Azor
U nás v Kocourkově .... Dr. Nykys
České Vánoce .... Tomek
Důkaz .... Hal
Šakalí léta .... Eda Drábek
Ach, ta láska prodejná.... Youngster, Viola Theatre
Hodina mezi psem a vlkem .... František Villon
Jezinky Bezinky .... O´Hara
Kočičí hra
Mahábhárata .... Ashwattháman 
Mamzelle Nitouche .... Loriot
Mrtvé duše .... Mr. Petruška
Some Like It Hot .... singer Sugar
Pan Kaplan má třídu rád .... Vasil Hruška
Plukovník Pták
Pohádková detektivka .... Sherlock Holmes
Pohádky z košíku .... many roles
Pohádky do kapsy .... 
Pověsti pro štěstí .... Choreography+many roles
Rebelové .... Olda/Šimon
Skapinova šibalství .... Leandr
Slaměný klobouk .... Bobin
Taxi na věčnost .... Eddie
 .... Young Jerome
Turandot .... Kalaf
Perfect Wedding .... Bill
Twelfth Night .... Sebastian
The Merry Wives of Windsor .... Abraham Tintítko
V jámě lvové .... Jakschitz
Voják a tanečnice .... Croupier/Molière

Other stage works 
Benátská vdovička .... Arlecchino, Jaroslav Ježek Conservatory
Romeo and Juliet, Most Theatre
The Picture of Dorian Gray .... Adrian, Ta Fantastika Theatre
Žena v černém ..... Actor, Rubín Theatre
Players .... Glov jr., Rokoko Theatre
Saturnin .... Jiří, Příbram's Theatre
Touha .... Benedikt Berousek, Kalich Theatre
Zlatí uhoři .... Hugo, Rokoko Theatre
Já, Francois Villon¨... muzikál...Jiří Hubač / Ondřej Brzobohatý / Pavel Vrba ... Divadlo Na Jezerce

Filmography 
Little Knights Tale (2009)
"Proč bychom se netopili" (2009) TV series
Zrození rytířů (2009 (TV)
Skeletoni (2008)
Roc(c)k podvraťáků (2006)
"Bazén" (2005) TV series
Stříbrná vůně mrazu (2005) (TV)
Snowboarďáci (2004)
Probuzená skála (2003) (TV)
Vetřelci v Coloradu (2002) (TV)
Štěstí krále Alfonse (1996) (TV)
V den psa (1994) 
Městem chodí Mikuláš (1992)

References

External links 
 

1979 births
Living people
Czech male stage actors
Czech male television actors
Male actors from Prague
Czech male voice actors
20th-century Czech male actors
21st-century Czech male actors